Marius Mayrhofer (born 18 September 2000) is a German cyclist, who currently rides for UCI WorldTeam .

Major results

2017
 1st  Road race, National Junior Road Championships
 1st Stage 2 Oberösterreich Juniorenrundfahrt
2018
 1st Grand Prix Bob Jungels
 1st Trofeo comune di Vertova
 2nd  Road race, UCI Junior Road World Championships
 6th Johan Museeuw Classic
 7th Overall Giro della Lunigiana
 8th Overall Oberösterreich Juniorenrundfahrt
1st  Points classification
1st Stage 1
 10th Overall Course de la Paix Juniors
1st Stages 1 & 2b
2020
 5th Road race, National Road Championships
2021
 9th Overall Kreiz Breizh Elites
 10th Grote Prijs Marcel Kint
 10th Per Sempre Alfredo
2023
 1st Cadel Evans Great Ocean Road Race

References

External links

2000 births
Living people
German male cyclists
Sportspeople from Tübingen
Cyclists from Baden-Württemberg